Nandikotkur is a municipality and mandal in Nandyal district of Andhra Pradesh, India.

Geography
It has an average elevation of 292 meters (961 feet). The nearest river is Krishna river.

Nandikotkur is a mandal (equivalent to county or borough), located 27 km from Kurnool district in Andhra Pradesh. It serves as a major transit point connecting important cities including Kurnool and Guntur. The route to Srisailam from Kurnool also traverses through Nandikotkur. The legend says that Nandikotkur is surrounded by nine nandi statues (bulls) and hence this place was earlier called NavaNandikotkur and now this is called Nandikotkur. Handri Neeva Canal which provides irrigation water to Kurnool, Anantapur, Kadapa and Chittoor districts starts from Nadikotkur Mandal only. Sangamaheshwaram the place where seven rivers meet is located around 25 km from Nandikotkur. The population of Nandikotkur is 46,953

Transport 
The Andhra Pradesh State Road Transport Corporation operates bus services from Nandikotkur bus station.

Distance to Major towns and cities 

 Kurnool = 30 km
 Nandyal = 58 km
 Adoni = 130 km
 Atmakur = 39 km
 Guntur = 270 km
 Kadapa = 190 km
 Tirupati = 330 km
 Hyderabad = 240 km
 Bengaluru = 380 km
 Vijayawada = 310 km

Education
The primary and secondary school education is imparted by government, aided and private schools, under the School Education Department of the state. The medium of instruction followed by different schools are English, Telugu.

Entertainment

Movies 

 Sri Rama
 Sri Krishna
 Shanti
 Shiva Shankar

References
Official Website of Nandikotkur www.nandikotkur.com 

Cities and towns in Nandyal district
Mandals in Nandyal district